Mochlus mabuiiformis, also known as the Mabuya-like writhing skink or Mabuya-like skink, is a species of skink. This poorly known species is found in southern Somalia and north coastal Kenya.

References

Mochlus
Skinks of Africa
Reptiles of Kenya
Reptiles of Somalia
Reptiles described in 1935
Taxa named by Arthur Loveridge